Hemicyoninae is an extinct subfamily of Ursidae, often called dog bears (literally "half dog"). They are sometimes classified as a separate family.

Systematics
 Subfamily †Hemicyoninae (Frick, 1926)
 Tribe †Cephalogalini (de Bonis, 2013)
 †Adelpharctos (de Bonis, 1971)
 †Adelpharctos ginsburgi (de Bonis, 2011)
 †Adelpharctos mirus (de Bonis, 1971)
 †Cyonarctos (de Bonis, 2013)
 †Cyonarctos dessei (de Bonis, 2013)
 †Phoberogale (Ginsburg & Morales, 1995)
 †Phoberogale minor (Filhol, 1877)
 †Phoberogale bonali (Helbing, 1928)
 †Phoberogale depereti (Viret, 1929)
 †Phoberogale gracile (Pomel, 1847)
 †Filholictis (de Bonis, 2013)
 †Filholictis filholi (Munier-Chalmas, 1877)
 †Cephalogale (Jourdan, 1862)
 †Cephalogale shareri (Wang, et al., 2009)
 †Cephalogale gergoviensis (Viret, 1929)
 †Cephalogale ginesticus (Kuss, 1962)
 †Cephalogale geoffroyi (Jourdan, 1862)
 Tribe †Phoberocyonini (Ginsburg & Morales, 1995)
 †Plithocyon (Ginsburg, 1955)
 †Plithocyon armagnacensis (Ginsburg, 1955)
 †Plithocyon statzlingii (Frick, 1926)
 †Plithocyon bruneti (Ginsburg, 1980)
 †Plithocyon barstowensis (Frick, 1926)
 †Plithocyon ursinus (Cope, 1875)
 †Phoberocyon (Ginsburg, 1955)
 †Phoberocyon hispanicus (Ginsburg & Morales, 1998)
 †Phoberocyon dehmi (Ginsburg, 1955)
 †Phoberocyon huerzeleri (Ginsburg, 1955)
 †Phoberocyon aurelianensis (Mayet, 1908)
 †Phoberocyon youngi (Xiang et al., 1986)
 †Phoberocyon johnhenryi (White, 1947)
 Tribe †Hemicyonini (Frick, 1926)
 †Zaragocyon (Ginsburg & Morales, 1995)
 †Zaragocyon daamsi (Ginsburg & Morales, 1995)
 †Dinocyon (Jourdan, 1861)
 †Dinocyon aurelianensis (Frick, 1926)
 †Dinocyon sansaniensis (Frick, 1926)
 †Dinocyon thenardi (Jourdan, 1861)
 †Hemicyon (Lartet, 1851)
 †Hemicyon barbouri (Colbert, 1941)
 †Hemicyon teilhardi (Colbert, 1939)
 †Hemicyon grivensis (Frick, 1926)
 †Hemicyon minor (Dépéret, 1887)
 †Hemicyon sansaniensis (Lartet, 1851)

References

 
Oligocene bears
Miocene carnivorans
Chattian first appearances
Messinian extinctions
Mammal subfamilies